James Owen Dorsey  (October 31, 1848 – February 4, 1895) was an American ethnologist, linguist, and Episcopalian missionary in the Dakota Territory, who contributed to the description of the Ponca, Omaha, and other southern Siouan languages. He worked for the Bureau of American Ethnology of the Smithsonian Institution from 1880 to 1895, when he died young of typhoid fever. He became known as the expert on languages and culture of southern Siouan peoples, although he also studied tribes of the Southwest and Northwest.

Dorsey also collected much material on beliefs and institutions, although most of his manuscripts have not been published. Some of the many stories he collected from the Ponca and Osage have been published, and are being used in an Omaha-language curriculum project at the University of Nebraska-Lincoln.

Early life and education
James Owen Dorsey was born in Baltimore, Maryland in 1848. He attended the Virginia Theological Seminary in Alexandria, and was ordained as a deacon of the Episcopal Church in 1871. He was a descendant of Edward Dorsey.

Career
That year he became a missionary to the Ponca Indians in the Dakota Territory.  He had a remarkable aptitude for languages, and a sympathetic and helpful personality which won the confidence of the Indians. He lived 27 months as a missionary in Nebraska and South Dakota, learning the difficult (for English speakers) Siouan language of the Ponca and Omaha Indians.

Ill health forced Dorsey to leave the West and to become a pastor in Maryland.  He continued to study linguistics and to work on linguistic analysis of Ponca and Omaha. In the early years, he tried to link those languages with Hebrew, in the mistaken theory, shared by many scholars at the time, that Native Americans were among the Lost Tribes of Israel. These efforts were considered "crude and immature."  But, he developed into a linguist and anthropologist who presented Indian cultures with "unsurpassed fidelity."

In 1878, in the formative period of the Bureau of American Ethnology (BAE) as part of the Smithsonian Institution, the director John Wesley Powell engaged Dorsey to return to Nebraska to compile dictionaries of the Omaha and Ponca languages. In 1880, Dorsey returned to Washington to work with the BAE at the Smithsonian as a specialist in Siouan languages, a position he held for the rest of his life.

Dorsey later did field work with the Siouan-speaking Tutelo in Canada, the Biloxi in Louisiana, and the Quapaw in Oklahoma. In addition, he studied several tribes along the Oregon coast, where he compiled materials on the Athabaskan (also called Dene), Coosan, Takilman, and Yakonan language families or "stocks", some of which were spoken by small groups of people. In 1884 he was the last to record the Yakona (Yaquina) language, which is now extinct.

Dorsey also compiled word lists and dictionaries of the Kansa and Osage languages.  He became the foremost expert on the languages and culture of southern Siouan peoples. Many of his extensive compilations of vocabulary, grammar, myths, oral histories, and cultural practices are still unpublished.

Dorsey died of typhoid fever in 1895 in Washington, D.C. at age 47.

References

Publications
 A Dictionary of the Biloxi and Ofo languages, accompanied with thirty-one Biloxi tests and numerous Biloxi phrases, 1912 
 A Dakota-English dictionary, Edited by James Owen Dorsey, 1968
 "Omaha and Ponca Letters" (1890), (Contributions to North American Ethnography VI), supplement, 1891 
 Omaha Dwellings, Furniture and Implements, 1892-1893
 Osage Traditions, 1888
 Omaha Sociology, 1884
 The Cehiga Language, 1890

External links
 
 
 "J.O. Dorsey", E-Museum, Minnesota State University Mankato 
 "Nineteenth Century Omaha Texts," collected by James Owen Dorsey, 1890, Omaha (Degiha) Language, OMAHA LANGUAGE CURRICULUM DEVELOPMENT PROJECT,  University of Nebraska-Lincoln (includes link to audio version of one story)
 J. O. Dorsey (1890-1891), "Ponca & Omaha Texts", University of Colorado

American anthropologists
1848 births
1895 deaths
Linguists of Siouan languages
19th-century anthropologists
Linguists from the United States
19th-century linguists
19th-century American Episcopalians
People from Baltimore
Episcopalians from Maryland
Virginia Theological Seminary alumni
Deaths from typhoid fever
Infectious disease deaths in Washington, D.C.
American Anglican missionaries
Missionary linguists
Dorsey family of Maryland